Prodontia dimidiata is a species of beetle in the family Cerambycidae, the only species in the genus Prodontia.

References

Trachyderini
Monotypic beetle genera